Terry Lynn Brown (born January 9, 1947 in Walters, Oklahoma) played professional American football from 1969–1976 in the National Football League. He is most famous for scoring the Minnesota Vikings only points of Super Bowl IX on a blocked punt.

External links
Pro-Football-Reference

1947 births
Living people
People from Walters, Oklahoma
Players of American football from Oklahoma
American football safeties
Oklahoma State Cowboys football players
St. Louis Cardinals (football) players
Minnesota Vikings players
Cleveland Browns players
People from Marlow, Oklahoma